The high-speed rail (HSR) network in the People's Republic of China (PRC) is the world's longest and most extensively used – with a total length of  by the end of 2022. China's HSR accounts for two-thirds of the world's total high-speed railway networks. Almost all HSR trains, track and service are owned and operated by the China Railway Corporation under the brand China Railway High-speed (CRH).

High-speed rail developed rapidly in China since the mid-2000s. Tentative services began operation in 2003, while the China Railway High-speed (CRH) was introduced in April 2007 and the Beijing-Tianjin intercity rail, which opened in August 2008, was the first passenger dedicated HSR line. Currently, the HSR extends to all provincial-level administrative divisions and Hong Kong SAR, with the exception of Macau SAR. The HSR building boom continues with the HSR network set to reach  in 2035.

Economically, there were initial concerns, particularly outside China, over the high-speed rail's cost, debt and profitability. However, a Paulson Institute research had estimated that the net benefit of the high-speed rail to the Chinese economy to be approximately $378 billion and an annual return on investment at 6.5%. In 2021, China's state railway company have also vowed to prioritise in reforms that aims to improve the productivity and efficiency of its high speed rail network, rather than focus on the expansion of track mileage.

A 2019 World Bank study estimated the rate of economic return of China's high-speed rail network to be at 8 percent, which is well above the opportunity cost of capital in China for major long term infrastructure investments. The study also noted a range of benefits which included shortened travel times, improved safety and better facilitation of tourism, labor and mobility, as well as reducing highway congestion, accidents and greenhouse emissions as some automobile travellers switch from car use to rail. The institution also found "a broad range of travelers of different income levels choose HSR for its comfort, convenience, safety and punctuality."

Definition and terminology 
EMU train sets have no more than 16 railcars with axle load not greater than 17 tonnes and service interval of not less than three minutes.

EMU trains operating on non-high speed track or otherwise but at speeds below  are not considered high-speed rail.

In common parlance, high-speed train service in China generally refers to G-, D- and C-class passenger train service.

 G-class train service generally features EMU trains running on passenger-dedicated high-speed rail lines and operating at top speeds of at least .
 D-class train service features EMU trains running at lower speeds, whether on high-speed or non-high-speed track. D-class trains can vary widely in actual trip speed. The D312 EMU sleeper train between Beijing South and Shanghai on the non-high speed Beijing–Shanghai railway averages  for the trip.
 C-class train service that operate on high-speed track at speeds above  are also considered high-speed rail service.

High-speed ridership statistics in China are often reported as the number of passengers carried by high-speed EMU train sets, and such figures typically include passengers on EMU trains operating on non-high speed track or at service speeds below .

History

Precursor
The earliest example of higher-speed commercial train service in China was the Asia Express, a luxury passenger train that operated in Japanese-controlled Manchuria from 1934 to 1943. It was faster than the fastest trains in Japan at the time. After the founding of the People's Republic of China in 1949, this train model was renamed the SL-7 and was used by the Chinese Minister of Railways.

Early planning

State planning for China's current high-speed railway network began in the early 1990s under the leadership of Deng Xiaoping. He set up what became known as the "high-speed rail dream" after his visit to Japan in 1978, where he was deeply impressed by the Shinkansen, the world's first high speed rail system. In December 1990, the Ministry of Railways (MOR) submitted to the National People's Congress a proposal to build a high-speed railway between Beijing and Shanghai. At the time, the Beijing–Shanghai Railway was already at capacity, and the proposal was jointly studied by the Science & Technology Commission, State Planning Commission, State Economic & Trade Commission, and the MOR. In December 1994, the State Council commissioned a feasibility study for the line.

Policy planners debated the necessity and economic viability of high-speed rail service. Supporters argued that high-speed rail would boost future economic growth. Opponents noted that high-speed rail in other countries were expensive and mostly unprofitable. Overcrowding on existing rail lines, they said, could be solved by expanding capacity through higher speed and frequency of service. In 1995, Premier Li Peng announced that preparatory work on the Beijing Shanghai HSR would begin in the 9th Five Year Plan (1996–2000), but construction was not scheduled until the first decade of the 21st century.

The "Speed Up" campaigns 

In 1993, commercial train service in China averaged only  and was steadily losing market share to airline and highway travel on the country's expanding network of expressways. The MOR focused modernization efforts on increasing the service speed and capacity on existing lines through double-tracking, electrification, improving grade (through tunnels and bridges), reducing turn curvature and installing continuous welded rail.

A notable example is the Guangshen–Shenzhen railway, which in December 1994 became the first line in China to offer sub-high-speed service of  using domestically produced DF-class diesel locomotives. After the completion of a third track in 2000 and a fourth in 2007, the line became the first in China to run high-speed passenger and freight service on separate tracks.

The introduction of more non-stop service between large cities also helped to reduce travel time. The non-stop express train from Beijing to Fuzhou shortened travel time from 33.5 to less than 20 hours.
In addition to track and scheduling improvements, the MOR also deployed faster CRH series trains. During the Sixth Railway Speed Up Campaign, 52 CRH trainsets (CRH1, CRH2 and CRH5) entered into operation. The new trains reduced travel time between Beijing and Shanghai by two hours to just under 10 hours. Some 295 stations have been built or renovated to allow high-speed trains.

The conventional rail v. maglev debate
The development of the HSR network in China was initially delayed by a debate over the type of track technology to be used. In June 1998, at a State Council meeting with the Chinese Academies of Sciences and Engineering, Premier Zhu Rongji asked whether the high-speed railway between Beijing and Shanghai still being planned could use maglev technology. At the time, planners were divided between using high-speed trains with wheels that run on conventional standard gauge tracks or magnetic levitation trains that run on special maglev tracks for a new national high-speed rail network.

Maglev received a big boost in 2000 when the Shanghai Municipal Government agreed to purchase a turnkey TransRapid train system from Germany for the  rail link connecting Shanghai Pudong International Airport and the city. In 2004, the Shanghai Maglev Train became the world's first commercially operated high-speed maglev.

Despite unmatched advantage in speed, the maglev has not gained widespread use in China's high-speed rail network due to high cost, German refusal to share technology and concerns about safety. The price tag of the Shanghai Maglev was believed to be $1.3 billion and was partially financed by the German government. The refusal of the Transrapid Consortium to share technology and source production in China made large-scale maglev production much more costly than high-speed train technology for conventional lines. Finally, residents living along the proposed maglev route have raised health concerns about noise and electromagnetic radiation emitted by the trains, despite an environmental assessment by the Shanghai Academy of Environmental Sciences saying the line was safe. These concerns have prevented the construction of the proposed extension of the maglev to Hangzhou. Even the more modest plan to extend the maglev to Shanghai's other airport, Hongqiao, has stalled. Instead, a conventional subway line was built to connect the two airports, and a conventional high-speed rail line was built between Shanghai and Hangzhou.

While maglev was drawing attention to Shanghai, conventional track HSR technology was being tested on the newly completed Qinhuangdao-Shenyang Passenger Railway. This  standard gauge, dual-track, electrified line was built between 1999 and 2003. The Qinhuangdao-Shenyang Line showed the greater compatibility of HSR on conventional track with the rest of China's standard gauge rail network.

In 2004, the State Council in its Mid-to-Long Term Railway Development Plan, adopted conventional track HSR technology over maglev for the Beijing–Shanghai High Speed Railway and three other north–south high-speed rail lines. This decision ended the debate and cleared the way for rapid construction of standard gauge, passenger dedicated HSR lines in China.

Acquisition of foreign technology

Despite setting speed records on test tracks, the DJJ2, DJF2 and other domestically produced high-speed trains were insufficiently reliable for commercial operation. The State Council turned to advanced technology abroad but made clear in directives that China's HSR expansion could not only benefit foreign economies and should also be used to develop its own high-speed train building capacity through technology transfers. The State Council, MOR and state-owned train builders used China's large market and competition among foreign train-makers to force technology transfers of foreign high speed rail technology. This would later allow the Chinese government through CRRC to make the more reliable Fuxing Hao and Hexie Hao trains. The CRH380 series(or family) of trains was initially built with direct cooperation (or help) from foreign trainmakers, but newer trainsets are based on transferred technology, just like the Hexie and Fuxing Hao.

In 2003, the MOR was believed to favor Japan's Shinkansen technology, especially the 700 series. The Japanese government touted the 40-year track record of the Shinkansen and offered favorable financing. However, Chinese citizens angry with Japan's denial of World War II war crimes organized a web campaign to oppose the awarding of HSR contracts to Japanese companies. The protests gathered over a million signatures and politicized the issue. The MOR delayed the decision, broadened the bidding and adopted a diversified approach to adopting foreign high-speed train technology.

In June 2004, the MOR solicited bids to make 200 high-speed train sets that can run . Alstom of France, Siemens of Germany, Bombardier Transportation based in Germany and a Japanese consortium led by Kawasaki all submitted bids. With the exception of Siemens which refused to lower its demand of CN¥350 million per train set and €390 million for the technology transfer, the other three were all awarded portions of the contract. All had to adapt their HSR train-sets to China's own common standard and assemble units through local joint ventures (JV) or cooperate with Chinese manufacturers. Bombardier, through its joint venture with CSR's Sifang Locomotive and Rolling Stock Co (CSR Sifang), Bombardier Sifang (Qingdao) Transportation Ltd (BST). won an order for 40 eight-car train sets based on Bombardier's Regina design. These trains, designated CRH1A, were delivered in 2006. Kawasaki won an order for 60 train sets based on its E2 Series Shinkansen for ¥9.3 billion. Of the 60 train sets, three were directly delivered from Nagoya, Japan, six were kits assembled at CSR Sifang Locomotive & Rolling Stock, and the remaining 51 were made in China using transferred technology with domestic and imported parts. They are known as CRH2A. Alstom also won an order for 60 train sets based on the New Pendolino developed by Alstom-Ferroviaria in Italy. The order had a similar delivery structure with three shipped directly from Savigliano along with six kits assembled by CNR's CRRC Changchun Railway Vehicles, and the rest locally made with transferred technology and some imported parts. Trains with Alstom technology carry the CRH5 designation.

The following year, Siemens reshuffled its bidding team, lowered prices, joined the bidding for  trains and won a 60-train set order. It supplied the technology for the CRH3C, based on the ICE3 (class 403) design, to CNR's Tangshan Railway Vehicle Co. Ltd. The transferred technology includes assembly, body, bogie, traction current transforming, traction transformers, traction motors, traction control, brake systems, and train control networks.

Technology transfer
Achieving indigenous high-speed rail technology has been a major goal of Chinese state planners. Chinese train-makers, after receiving transferred foreign technology, have been able to achieve a considerable degree of self-sufficiency in making the next generation of high-speed trains by developing indigenous capability to produce key parts and improving upon foreign designs.

Examples of technology transfer include Mitsubishi Electric’s MT205 traction motor and ATM9 transformer to CSR Zhuzhou Electric, Hitachi’s YJ92A traction motor and Alstom’s YJ87A Traction motor to CNR Yongji Electric, Siemens’ TSG series pantograph to Zhuzhou Gofront Electric. Most of the components of the CRH trains manufactured by Chinese companies were from local suppliers, with only a few parts imported.

For foreign train-makers, technology transfer is an important part of gaining market access in China. Bombardier, the first foreign train-maker to form a joint venture in China, has been sharing technology for the manufacture of railway passenger cars and rolling stock since 1998. Zhang Jianwei, President and Chief Country Representative of Bombardier China, stated that in a 2009 interview, “Whatever technology Bombardier has, whatever the China market needs, there is no need to ask. Bombardier transfers advanced and mature technology to China, which we do not treat as an experimental market.” Unlike other series which have imported prototypes, all CRH1 trains have been assembled at Bombardier's joint-venture with CSR, Bombardier Sifang in Qingdao.

Kawasaki's cooperation with CSR did not last as long. Within two years of cooperation with Kawasaki to produce 60 CRH2A sets, CSR began in 2008 to build CRH2B, CRH2C and CRH2E models at its Sifang plant independently without assistance from Kawasaki. According to CSR president Zhang Chenghong, CSR "made the bold move of forming a systemic development platform for high-speed locomotives and further upgrading its design and manufacturing technology. Later, we began to independently develop high-speed CRH trains with a maximum velocity of 300–350 kilometers per hour, which eventually rolled off the production line in December 2007." Since then, CSR has ended its cooperation with Kawasaki. Kawasaki challenged China's high-speed rail project for patent theft, but backed off the effort.

Along with CRH3C, produced by Siemens and CNR Tangshan, CSR Sifang bid 60 sets of CRH2C.

To increase transport capacity, the MOR ordered 70 16-car trainsets from CSR Sifang and BST, including 10 sets of CRH1B and 20 sets of CRH2B seating trains, 20 sets of CRH1E and 20 sets of CRH2E sleeper trains.

In the same year, the Ministry of Science and the MOR agreed to a joint action plan for the indigenous innovation of high-speed trains in China. A total of 400 new generation trains were ordered. The CRH380A/AL, the first indigenous high-speed train of the CRH series, entered service on the Shanghai-Hangzhou High-Speed Railway on October 26, 2010.

Early passenger-dedicated high-speed rail lines
After committing to conventional-track high-speed rail in 2006, the state embarked on an ambitious campaign to build passenger-dedicated high-speed rail lines, which accounted for a large part of the government's growing budget for rail construction. Total investment in new rail lines grew from $14 billion in 2004 to $22.7 and $26.2 billion in 2006 and 2007. In response to the global economic recession, the government accelerated the pace of HSR expansion to stimulate economic growth. Total investments in new rail lines including HSR reached $49.4 billion in 2008 and $88 billion in 2009. In all, the state planned to spend $300 billion to build a  HSR network by 2020.

As of 2007, the Qinhuangdao-Shenyang high-speed railway, which carried trains at top speed of  along the Liaoxi Corridor in the Northeast, was the only passenger-dedicated HSR line (PDL) in China, but that would soon change as the country embarked on a high-speed railway construction boom.

National high-speed rail grid (4+4)

Higher-speed express train service allowed more trains to share the tracks and improved rail transport capacity. But high-speed trains often have to share tracks with slower, heavy freight trains – in some cases with as little as 5 minutes headway. To attain higher speeds and transport capacity, planners began to propose a passenger-dedicated HSR network on a grand scale. Initiated by MOR's 2004 "Mid-to-Long Term Railway Network Plan", a national grid composed of eight high-speed rail corridors, four running north–south and four going east–west, was to be constructed. The envisioned network, together with upgraded existing lines, would total  in length. Most of the new lines follow the routes of existing trunk lines and are designated for passenger travel only. They became known as passenger-designated lines (PDLs). Several sections of the national grid, especially along the southeast coastal corridor, were built to link cities that had no previous rail connections. Those sections will carry a mix of passenger and freight. High-speed trains on PDLs can generally reach . The earliest PDLs built were sections of the corridors that connected large cities in the same region. On August 1, 2008, the Beijing–Tianjin intercity railway opened in time for the 2008 Summer Olympics. This ambitious national grid project was planned to be built by 2020, but the government's stimulus has expedited time-tables considerably for many of the lines.

The Wuhan–Guangzhou high-speed railway (Wuguang PDL), which opened on December 26, 2009, was the country's first cross-regional high-speed rail line. Train travel between central and southern China’s largest cities, Wuhan and Guangzhou, was reduced to just over three hours.
On October 26, 2010, China opened its 15th high-speed rail, the Shanghai–Hangzhou line, and unveiled the CRH380A trainset manufactured by CSR Sifang started regular service.

The MOR reportedly committed investment of ¥709.1 billion (US$107.9 billion) in railway construction in 2010 and would invest ¥700 billion (US$106 billion) in 2011 on 70 railway projects, including 15 high-speed rail projects. Some  of new high-speed railways would be opened, and by the end of 2011, China would have  of railways capable of carrying trains at speeds of at least .

Corruption and concerns

In February 2011, Railway Minister Liu Zhijun, a key proponent of HSR expansion in China, was removed from office on charges of corruption. The Economist estimates Liu accepted ¥1 billion of bribes ($152 million) in connection with railway construction projects. Investigators found evidence that another ¥187 million ($28.5 million) was misappropriated from the $33 billion Beijing–Shanghai high-speed railway in 2010.
Another top official in the Railways Ministry, Zhang Shuguang, was also sacked for corruption. Zhang was estimated to have misappropriated to his personal overseas accounts the equivalent of $2.8 billion.

After the political shake-up, concerns about HSR safety, high ticket prices, financial sustainability and environmental impact received greater scrutiny in the Chinese press.

In April 2011, the new Minister of Railways Sheng Guangzu said that due to corruption, safety may have been compromised on some construction projects and completion dates may have to be pushed back. Sheng announced that all trains in the high-speed rail network would operate at a maximum speed of  beginning on July 1, 2011. This was in response to concerns over safety, low ridership due to high ticket prices, and high energy usage. Higher-speed train travel uses greater energy and imposes more wear on expensive machinery.
In May 2011, China's Environmental Protection Ministry ordered the halting of construction and operation of two high-speed lines that failed to pass environmental impact tests. In June, the MOR maintained that high-speed rail construction was not slowing down.
Under political and public pressure, the National Audit Office (NAO) carried out an extensive investigation into the building quality of all high-speed rail lines. As of March 2011, no major quality defects had been found in the system. From July 20, 2011, the frequency of train service from Jinan to Beijing and Tianjin was reduced due to low occupancy, which renewed concerns about demand and profitability for high-speed services. Service failures in the first month of operation drove passengers back to pre-existing slower rail service and air travel; airline ticket prices rebounded due to reduced competition.

Wenzhou accident

On July 23, 2011, two high-speed trains collided on the Ningbo–Taizhou–Wenzhou railway in Lucheng District of Wenzhou, Zhejiang Province. The accident occurred when one train traveling near Wenzhou was struck by lightning, lost power and stalled. Signals malfunctioned, causing another train to rear-end the stalled train. Several carriages derailed. State-run Chinese media confirmed 40 deaths, and at least 192 people hospitalised, including 12 who were severely injured. The Wenzhou train accident and the lack of accountability by railway officials caused a public uproar and heightened concerns about the safety and management of China's high-speed rail system. Quality and safety concerns also affected plans to export cheaper high-speed train technology to other countries.

The train collision, which killed 40 people and injured 192, exposed poor management by the railway company. This fatal accident, which happened in the midst of corruption investigations into railway officials, led to greater scrutiny in the Chinese press concerning the HSR. It led to greater scrutiny on railway company by the Chinese press and among the Chinese populace.

Following the deadly crash, the Chinese government suspended new railway project approvals and launched safety checks on existing equipment. A commission was formed to investigate the accident with a directive to report its findings in September 2011. On August 10, 2011, the Chinese government announced that it was suspending approvals of any new high-speed rail lines pending the outcome of the investigation. To stimulate ridership, on August 16, 2011 ticket prices on high-speed trains were reduced by five percent. From July to September, high-speed rail ridership in China fell by nearly 30 million to 151 million trips.

Slowdown in financing and construction

In the first half of 2011, the MOR as a whole made a profit of ¥4.29 billion and carried a total debt burden of ¥2.09 trillion, equal to about 5% of China's GDP. Earnings from the more profitable freight lines helped to off-set losses by high-speed rail lines. As of years ending 2008, 2009 and 2010, the MOR's debt-to-asset ratio was respectively, 46.81%, 53.06% and 57.44%, and reached 58.58% by mid-year 2011. As of October 12, 2011, the MOR had issued ¥160 billion of debt for the year. But in the late summer, state banks began to cut back on lending to rail construction projects, which reduced funding for existing railway projects. An investigation of 23 railway construction companies in August 2011 revealed that 70% of existing projects had been slowed or halted mainly due to shortage of funding. Affected lines included Xiamen-Shenzhen, Nanning-Guangzhou, Guiyang-Guangzhou, Shijiazhuang-Wuhan, Tianjin-Baoding and Shanghai-Kunming high-speed rail lines. New projects were put on hold and completion dates for existing projects, including the Tianjin-Baoding, Harbin-Jiamusi, Zhengzhou-Xuzhou and Hainan Ring (West), were pushed back. As of October 2011, the MOR was reportedly concentrating remaining resources on fewer high-speed rail lines and shifting emphasis to more economically viable coal transporting heavy rail.

To ease the credit shortage facing rail construction, the Ministry of Finance announced tax cuts to interest earned on rail construction financing bonds and the State Council ordered state banks to renew lending to rail projects. In late October and November 2011, the MOR raised RMB 250 billion in fresh financing and construction resumed on several lines including the Tianjin-Baoding, Xiamen-Shenzhen and Shanghai-Kunming.

Recovery

By early 2012, the Chinese government renewed investments in high-speed rail to rejuvenate the slowing economy. Premier Wen Jiabao visited train manufacturers and gave a vote of confidence in the industry. Over the course of the year, the MOR's budget rose from $64.3 billion to $96.5 billion. Five new lines totaling  in length entered operation between June 30 and December 31, including the Beijing-Wuhan section of the Beijing-Guangzhou line. By the end of 2012, the total length of high-speed rail tracks had reached , and ridership rebounded and exceeded levels prior to the Wenzhou crash. China's 1,580 high-speed trains were transporting 1.33 million passengers daily, about 25.7% of the overall passenger traffic. The Beijing–Tianjin, Shanghai–Nanjing, Beijing–Shanghai and Shanghai–Hangzhou lines reported breaking even financially The Shanghai-Nanjing line even reported to be operationally profitable, operating with a 380 million yuan net profit. However in 2013, only few lines had yet become profitable.

On December 28, 2013, the total length of high-speed rail tracks nationally topped  with the opening of the Xiamen–Shenzhen, Xian–Baoji, Chongqing−Lichuan high-speed railways as well as intercity lines in Hubei and Guangxi.

Second boom

In 2014, high-speed rail expansion gained speed with the opening of the Taiyuan–Xi'an, Hangzhou–Changsha, Lanzhou-Ürümqi, Guiyang-Guangzhou, Nanning-Guangzhou trunk lines and intercity lines around Wuhan, Chengdu, Qingdao and Zhengzhou. High-speed passenger rail service expanded to 28 provinces and regions. The number of high-speed train sets in operation grew from 1,277 pairs in June to 1,556.5 pairs in December.

In response to a slowing economy, central planners approved a slew of new lines including Shangqiu-Hefei-Hangzhou, Zhengzhou-Wanzhou, Lianyungang-Zhenjiang, Linyi-Qufu, Harbin-Mudanjiang, Yinchuan-Xi'an, Datong-Zhangjiakou, and intercity lines in Zhejiang and Jiangxi.

The government actively promoted the export of high-speed rail technology to countries including Mexico, Thailand, the United Kingdom, India, Russia and Turkey. To better compete with foreign trainmakers, the central authorities arranged for the merger of the country's two main high-speed train-makers, CSR and CNR, into CRRC.

By 2015, six high speed rail lines, Beijing–Tianjin, Shanghai–Nanjing, Beijing–Shanghai, Shanghai–Hangzhou, Nanjing–Hangzhou and Guangzhou–Shenzhen–Hong Kong report operational profitability. The Beijing–Shanghai is particularly profitable reporting a 6.6 billion yuan net profit.

In 2016, with the near completion of the National 4+4 grid, a new "Mid-to-Long Term Railway Network" Plan was drafted. The plan envisions a larger 8+8 high speed rail grid serving the nation and expanded intercity lines for regional and commuter services for large metropolitan areas of China. The proposed completion date for the network is 2030.

Since 2017, with the introduction of the Fuxing series of trains, a number of lines have resumed 350km/h operations such as Beijing–Shanghai HSR, Beijing–Tianjin ICR, and Chengdu–Chongqing ICR.

The HSR network reached  in total length by the end of 2020.

Development and social impact
China's high-speed rail expansion is entirely managed, planned and financed by the Chinese government.

Public concern 
On one hand, the demand of high-speed rail in China steadily increases over time. In 2012, the average occupancy rate of high-speed rails in China was 57%. This percentage increased to 65%, 69% and 72% in the year of 2013, 2014 and 2015, respectively. On the other hand, however, public concerns about the high-speed rail development have been raised from various perspectives.

The safety issue that drew the attention of the public and the government was the Wenzhou train collision which happened on July 23, 2011, in which 40 people died, 172 were injured, and 54 related officials blamed and punished. However, according to The New York Times, the Chinese high-speed rail network is "one of the world’s safest transportation systems."

Economic efficiency
Experts expressed concern of the network's operational efficiency. In 2016, Chinese railways carried almost 2 trillion ton-kilometers of freight and over 1 billion passenger-kilometer of passengers, making it one of the world's most intensively used freight and passenger railway networks in the world. However, the rail staff productivity upon railway track infrastructure index in China is less than 0.05, being the lowest among the countries with significant railway construction. The government also articulated the importance and urgency of assuring the capacity of railway staff, especially their familiarity with telecommunication and signaling testing in the official investigation of the Wenzhou train collision. In addition, it is hard to identify problems in the construction process, given the distribution resource planning system needed for rapid railway building and assembling. Suppliers and manufacturers blame each other for any problem detected in the trial operation, while tracking the construction process to every single detail is an almost impossible job for inspectors.

Despite having the second largest route-kilometer growth after Turkey since 2017, there has been debate whether China's high-speed railway network is economically efficient. Conservative scholars and officials are worried about the profitability of high-speed railway construction. While a number of high-speed railways in eastern China have started to be operationally profitable since 2015, the high speed railways in the midwest still operate at a loss. Zhengzhou–Xi'an high-speed railway is estimated to run 59 trains in 2010 and 125 trains in 2018, yet in 2016 there are merely around 30 trains on operation, causing a 1.4 billion loss. The Guiyang–Guangzhou high-speed railway and Lanzhou–Xinjiang high-speed railway are both suffering from high maintenance cost due to harsh climate conditions and complicated terrain structure.

According to a cost–benefit analysis by the Paulson Institute, the high-speed rail network benefits the Chinese economy by $378 billion, with an annual return on investment of 6.5%. The biggest cost savings were found to be time saved by replacing automobile and air trips, which contribute to increased traffic and delays at each endpoint respectively. The report also found that the highest benefit high-speed rail hubs were the ones going through densely populated corridors such as Shanghai, Hangzhou, Beijing, Wuhan and Guangzhou, while the lowest benefit ones were remote locations such as Kunming, Nanning and Ürümqi.

Policy justifications
Critics both in China and abroad have questioned the necessity of having an expensive high-speed rail system in a largely developing country, where most workers cannot afford to pay a premium for faster travel. The government has justified the expensive undertaking as promoting a number of policy objectives. HSR provides fast, reliable and comfortable means of transporting large numbers of travelers in a densely populated country over long distances, which:

 Improves economic productivity and competitiveness over the long term by increasing the transport capacity of railways and linking labor markets. Moving passengers to high-speed lines frees up older railways to carry more freight, which is more profitable for railways than passengers, whose fares are subsidized.
 Stimulates the economy in the short term as HSR construction creates jobs and drives up demand for construction, steel and cement industries during the economic downturn. Work on the Beijing–Shanghai HSR mobilized 110,000 workers.
 Facilitates cross-city economic integration and promotes the growth of second-tier cities. The introduction of the high-speed railways is responsible for 59% of the increase in market potential for the secondary cities connected by bullet trains. (Market potential, a concept used by economic geographers, measures "a geographic area's access to markets for inputs and outputs.") A 10% increase in a secondary city's market potential is expected to be associated with a 4.5% increase in its average real estate price. 
 Supports energy independence and environmental sustainability. Electric trains use less energy to transport people and goods on a per unit basis and can draw power from more diverse sources of energy including renewables than automobile and aircraft, which are more reliant on imported petroleum.
 Develop an indigenous high-speed rail equipment industry. The expansion into HSR is also developing China into a leading source of high-speed rail building technology. Chinese train-makers have absorbed imported technologies quickly, localized production processes, and even begun to compete with foreign suppliers in the export market. Six years after receiving Kawasaki's license to produce Shinkansen E2, CSC Sifang can produce the CRH2A without Japanese input, and Kawasaki has ended cooperation with Sifang on high-speed rail.

Profitability and debt 

One major concern of the high-speed rail network is the high amount of debt incurred. As of 2022, the China State Railway Group has had a debt of around $900 billion USD, according to Nikkei. Conservative scholars and officials are worried that the indebted high-speed rail is further exacerbated by its unprofitability, operating at a daily loss of $24 million USD as of November 2021. While a number of high-speed railways in eastern China have started to be operationally profitable since 2015, the high speed railways in the midwest still operate at a loss. Zhengzhou–Xi'an high-speed railway is estimated to run 59 trains in 2010 and 125 trains in 2018, yet in 2016 there are merely around 30 trains on operation, causing a 1.4 billion loss. The Guiyang–Guangzhou high-speed railway and Lanzhou–Xinjiang high-speed railway (where fares do not cover electricity costs) are both suffering from high maintenance cost due to harsh climate conditions and complicated terrain structure. The Beijing-Shanghai high-speed railway is one of the few lines that have been profitable, with profits steadily increasing after first breaking even in 2014, and achieving revenue of CNY 29.6 billion and net profit of CNY 12.7 billion in 2017. In an analysis conducted in 2019, only five out of fifteen high speed railway lines with travel speeds reaching 350 kilometers per hour, were able to cover all costs that included both the operating and capital costs.

Construction financing
China's high-speed rail construction projects are highly capital intensive. About 40–50% of financing is provided by the national government through lending by state owned banks and financial institutions, another 40% by the bonds issued by the Ministry of Railway (MOR) and the remaining 10–20% by provincial and local governments. The MOR, through its financing arm, the China Rail Investment Corp (CRIC), issued an estimated ¥1 trillion (US$150 billion in 2010 dollars) in debt to finance HSR construction from 2006 to 2010, including ¥310 billion in the first 10 months of 2010. CRIC has also raised some capital through equity offerings; in the spring of 2010, CRIC sold a 4.5 percent stake in the Beijing–Shanghai high-speed railway to the Bank of China for ¥6.6 billion and a 4.5 percent stake to the public for ¥6 billion. CRIC retained 56.2 percent ownership on that line. As of 2010, the CRIC-bonds are considered to be relatively safe investments because they are backed by assets (the railways) and implicitly by the government.

Large construction debt-loads require significant revenues from rider fares, subsidies, and/or other sources of income, such as advertising, to repay. Despite impressive ridership figures, virtually every completed line has incurred losses in its first years of operation. For example, the Beijing–Tianjin intercity railway in its two full years of operation, delivered over 41 million rides. The line cost ¥20.42 billion to build, and ¥1.8 billion per annum to operate, including ¥0.6 billion in interest payments on its ¥10 billion of loan obligations. The terms of the loans range from 5–10 years at interest rates of 6.3 to 6.8 percent. In its first year of operation from August 1, 2008, to July 31, 2009, the line carried 18.7 million riders and generated ¥1.1 billion in revenues, which resulted in a loss of ¥0.7 billion. In the second year, ridership rose to 22.3 million and revenues improved to ¥1.4 billion, which narrowed losses somewhat to below ¥0.5 billion. To break even, the line must deliver 30 million rides annually. To be able to repay principal, ridership would need to exceed 40 million. In September 2010, daily ridership averaged 69,000 or an annual rate of 25.2 million. In 2013, ridership totaled 25.85 million.
The line has a capacity of delivering 100 million rides annually and initial estimated repayment period of 16 years.

The Shijiazhuang-Taiyuan PDL lost ¥0.8 billion in its first year and is set to lose ¥0.9 billion in 2010. The Southeast HSR corridor lost ¥0.377 billion in its first year beginning August 2009. The Zhengzhou-Xian HSR since opening in February 2010 was expected to generate revenues of ¥0.6 billion in its first full year but must make interest payments of ¥1.1 billion. In the first three quarters of 2012, the line lost ¥1.87 billion. The losses must be covered by the operator, which is usually subsidized by local governments. In December 2014, the Henan provincial government imposed a rule requiring municipal authorities pay 70% of the deficit incurred by Henan's intercity lines with the provincial authorities paying the remainder 30%.

The MOR faces a debt-repayment peak in 2014. Some economists recommend further subsidies to lower fares and boost ridership and ultimately revenues. Others warn that the financing side of the existing construction and operation model is unsustainable. If the rail-backed loans cannot be fully repaid, they may be refinanced or the banks may seize ownership of the railways. To prevent that eventuality, the MOR is trying to improve management of its rapidly growing HSR holdings.

Overall, ridership is growing as the high-speed rail network continues to expand. High-speed rail is also becoming relatively more affordable as fares have remained stable while worker wages have grown sharply over the same period. In 2016, the high-speed rail revenue was 140.9 billion RMB Yuan (20 billion USD), while the same term interest from at least 3300 billion debt of its construction was 156.8 billion RMB Yuan (22.4 billion USD). According to the World Bank, a stable long term planning and standardization of technology and design used in the high-speed rail helps to reduce financial and operational cost. Standardization of designs and procedures such as train tracks, rolling stocks, signal systems keeps the construction cost down. Moreover, State-owned corporation also uses bulk purchasing to reduce material prices.

Fare cost comparisons

In 2013 fares for China's high-speed rail service costs significantly less than similar systems in other developed countries, for comparison high speed rail tickets in France or Germany cost slightly over US$0.10 per kilometer and the various Shinkansen services hover above US$0.20 per kilometer. However, China's average income per capita is considerably lower than these other countries, so the high speed train fares remain unaffordable for most but the well-to-do. In addition, high-speed rail fares are considerably more expensive than conventional rail service.

Impact on airlines
The spread of high-speed rail has forced domestic airlines in China to slash airfare and cancel regional flights. The impact of high-speed rail on air travel is most acute for intercity trips under . By the spring of 2011, commercial airline service had been completely halted on previously popular routes such as Wuhan–Nanjing, Wuhan–Nanchang, Xi’an–Zhengzhou and Chengdu–Chongqing. As of October 2013, high-speed rail was carrying twice as many passengers each month as the country's airlines.

Track network

China's high-speed railway network is by far the longest in the world. The HSR network reached  in total length in December 2022 with plans to reach  in 2035. According to a World Bank publication on Chinese HSR, by the end of 2017 "the length of 300–350 kph lines was about 10,000 km, and the length of 200–250 kph lines was about 15,000 km."

Newer HSR lines are one of three types:

Lastly, the HSR network includes newly built rail lines with a design speed of  that can carry high-speed passenger and express freight trains.

National High-Speed Rail Grid

The centerpiece of China's expansion into high-speed rail is a national high-speed rail grid consisting of mainly passenger dedicated lines that is overlaid onto the existing railway network.

4+4 HSR Grid
Most of the lines follow the routes of existing trunk lines and are designated for passenger traffic only. They are known as passenger-designated lines (PDL). Several sections of the national grid, especially along the southeast coastal corridor, were built to link cities that had no previous rail connections. Those sections will carry a mix of passenger and freight. High-speed trains on HSR Corridors can generally reach . This ambitious national grid project was planned to be built by 2020, but the government's stimulus has expedited time-tables considerably for many of the lines.

8+8 HSR Grid
The 4+4 national HSR grid was largely completed by the end of 2015 and now serves as the backbone of China's HSR network. In July 2016, the state planners reorganized the national HSR networkincluding HSR lines in operation, under construction and under planninginto eight vertical and eight horizontal high speed rail corridors, almost doubling the network.

Eight Verticals
Coastal corridor
Beijing–Shanghai corridor
Beijing–Hong Kong (Taipei) corridor
Harbin–Hong Kong (Macau) corridor
Hohhot–Nanning corridor
Beijing–Kunming corridor
Baotou (Yinchuan)–Hainan corridor
Lanzhou (Xining)–Guangzhou corridor
Eight Horizontals
Suifenhe–Manzhouli corridor
Beijing–Lanzhou corridor
Qingdao–Yinchuan corridor
Eurasia Continental Bridge corridor
Yangtze River corridor
Shanghai–Kunming corridor
Xiamen–Chongqing corridor
Guangzhou–Kunming corridor

Regional High-Speed Rail
These are also considered high-speed rail though they are not part of the national HSR grid or Intercity High Speed Rail. Several HSR lines planned and built as a regional high-speed railway under the 2008 Revisions have since been incorporated into the 8+8 national grid.

High-speed intercity railways
Intercity railways are designed to provide regional high-speed rail service between large cities and metropolitan areas that are generally within the same province. They are built with the approval of the central government but are financed and operated largely by local governments with limited investment and oversight from the China Rail Corporation. Some intercity lines run parallel to other high-speed rail lines but serve more stations along the route.

Passenger-freight railways and connecting conventional lines 
Some high speed trains also continue on or run over connecting segments of upgraded conventional lines.

Service

Rail operators

China Railway High-speed (CRH) (中国铁路高速) is the major high-speed rail service provided by state-owned railway manufacturing and construction corporation China Railway. China Railway is the successor of the former Ministry of Railways. Ministry held the power drafting policy on railroad transposition, development of the rail network and rail infrastructure in China. Nowadays, China Railway no longer decides the railway policy, instead focus on the development of the rail network and rail infrastructure in China. China Railway assumed control of complete railway network that was built by the dissolved Ministry of Railways. The CRH's high-speed trains are called Harmony and Rejuvenation. In October 2010, CRH service more than 1,000 trains per day, with a daily ridership of about 925,000.

Almost all HSR trains, tracks, and services are owned and operated by the China Railway Corporation under the brand China Railway High-speed (CRH) with two exceptions being the Shanghai Maglev Train, which is operated by the Shentong Metro Group, and Guangzhou–Shenzhen–Hong Kong Express Rail Link (XRL), which is partially operated by the Hong Kong-based MTR Corporation. Although both classified as high-speed rail, the Shanghai Maglev often is not counted as part of the national high-speed rail network, while XRL is fully integrated into the national network of the CRH.

China has the world's only commercial maglev high-speed train line in operation. It opened for operations in March 2004, and transports passengers between Shanghai's Longyang Road station and Shanghai Pudong International Airport. There have been numerous attempts to extend the line without success. A Shanghai-Hangzhou maglev line was also initially discussed but later shelved in favour of conventional high-speed rail.

Additionally, another two lines are under construction, the Qingyuan Maglev and the Fenghuang Maglev. The completion dates are 2020 and 2021.

Ridership

China Railway reports the number of passengers carried by high-speed EMU train sets and this figure is frequently reported as high-speed ridership, even though this figure includes passengers from EMU trains providing sub-high speed service. In 2007, CRH EMU trains running on conventional track upgraded in the sixth round of the "Speed-up Campaign" carried 61 million passengers, before the country's first high-speed rail line, the Beijing–Tianjin intercity railway, opened in August 2008.

In 2018, China Railway operated 3,970.5 pairs of passenger train service, of which 2,775 pairs were carried by EMU train sets. Of the 3.313 billion passenger-trips delivered by China Railway in 2018, EMU train sets carried 2.001 billion passenger-trips. This EMU passenger figure includes ridership from certain D- and C-class trains that are technically not within the definition of high-speed rail in China, as well as ridership from EMU train sets serving routes on conventional track or routes that combine high-speed track and conventional track. Nevertheless, by any measure, high-speed rail ridership in China has grown rapidly with expansion of the high-speed rail network and EMU service since 2008.

China is the third country, after Japan and France, to have one billion cumulative HSR passengers. In 2018, annual ridership on EMU train sets, which encompasses officially defined high-speed rail service as well as certain sub-high-speed service routes, accounted for about two-thirds of all regional rail trips (not including urban trains) in China. At the end of 2018, cumulative passengers delivered by EMU trains is reported to be over 9 billion.

Technology

Rolling stock

China Railway High-speed runs different electric multiple unit trainsets, the name Hexie Hao is for designs which are imported from other nations and designated CRH-1 through CRH-5 and CRH380A(L), CRH380B(L), and CRH380C(L). CRH trainsets are intended to provide fast and convenient travel between cities. Some of the Hexie Hao train sets are manufactured locally through technology transfer, a key requirement for China. The signalling, track and support structures, control software, and station design are developed domestically with foreign elements as well. By 2010, the truck system as a whole is predominantly Chinese. China currently holds many new patents related to the internal components of these trains, re-designed in China to allow the trains to run at higher speeds than the foreign designs allowed. However, these patents are only valid within China, and as such hold no international power. The weakness on intellectual property of Hexie Hao causes obstruction for China to export its high-speed rail related product, which leads to the development of the completely redesigned train franchise called Fuxing Hao that based on indigenous technologies.

Maglev
In October 2016 China's CRRC announced that it was beginning research and development on a  Maglev train and would build a  test track. In June 2020, a trial run was conducted at Tongji University. A planned launch of the maglev train was set for 2025.

Track technology

Many of the Passenger Designated Lines use ballastless tracks, which allow for smoother train rides at high speeds and can withstand heavy use without warping. The ballastless track technology, imported from Germany, carries higher upfront costs but can reduce maintenance costs.

Typical application of track technology in China high-speed lines

Technology export
Chinese train-makers and rail builders have signed agreements to build HSRs in Turkey, Venezuela, Argentina, and Indonesia and are bidding on HSR projects in the United States, Russia, Saudi Arabia, Brazil (São Paulo to Rio de Janeiro) and Myanmar, and other countries. They are competing directly with the established European and Japanese manufacturers, and sometimes partnering with them. In Saudi Arabia's Haramain High Speed Rail Project, Alstom partnered with China Railway Construction Corp. to win the contract to build phase I of the Mecca to Medina HSR line, and Siemens has joined CSR to bid on phase II. China is also competing with Japan, Germany, South Korea, Spain, France and Italy to bid for California's high-speed rail line project, which would connect San Francisco and Los Angeles. In November 2009, the MOR signed preliminary agreements with the state's high-speed rail authority and General Electric (GE) under which China would license technology, provide financing and furnish up to 20 percent of the parts with the remaining sourced from American suppliers, and final assembly of the rolling stock in the United States.

In January 2014, the China Railway Construction Corporation completed a  section of the Ankara-Istanbul high-speed railway between Eskişehir and İnönü in western Turkey.

In mid 2015, China has signed up to design a high-speed railway between the Russian cities of Moscow and Kazan, one of the first concrete examples of the new business with China that Russian officials have been pursuing with renewed vigor since falling out with the West. A unit of Russia's state-owned JSC Russian Railways signed a contract with the design unit of China's state-controlled China Railway Group to come up with the plans for a 770 kilometer high-speed rail between the two Russian cities. The Chinese firm will work alongside two Russian companies for on the designs for a total cost of 20.8 billion rubles ($383 million) over the next two years, according to Russian Railways.

Once the designs are developed, a separate tender will be held for the actual construction of the rail link, which Russian Railways expects to cost 1.06 trillion rubles ($19.5 billion).

Records

Fastest trains in China

The "fastest" train commercial service can be defined alternatively by a train's top speed or average trip speed.
 The fastest commercial train service measured by peak operational speed is the Shanghai Maglev Train which can reach . Due to the limited length of the Shanghai Maglev track , the maglev train's average trip speed is only .
The fastest timetabled start-to-stop runs between a station pair in the world are trains G17/G39 on the Beijing–Shanghai high-speed railway averaging  running non-stop between Beijing South to Nanjing South before continuing to other destinations. 

Longest service distance
It overtook the G529/530 trains for the  - Beihai  service (15 1/2 hours for southbound train, 15 3/4 hours for northbound train), which had set the previous record on July 1, 2016.

See also
 China Railway High-speed
 Fastest trains in China
 List of high-speed railway lines
 Rail transport in China

Notes

References

Citations

Sources

External links

 
High-speed rail in Asia